Before the Acts of Union 1707, the barons of the shire of Ross elected commissioners to represent them in the unicameral Parliament of Scotland and in the Convention of the Estates.

From 1708 Ross-shire was represented by one Member of Parliament in the House of Commons of Great Britain.

List of shire commissioners

 1649–50: Robert Munro of Obsdaill
During the Commonwealth of England, Scotland and Ireland, the sheriffdoms of Sutherland, Ross and Cromarty were jointly represented by one Member of Parliament in the Protectorate Parliament at Westminster. After the Restoration, the Parliament of Scotland was again summoned to meet in Edinburgh.
 1661–63, 1685, 1689–93: Sir George Munro of Culraine and Newmore (died 1693)  
 1661–63, 1678 (convention), 1681–82, 1685: Sir George Mackenzie of Tarbat and Cromarty 
 1665 convention: John Mackenzie of Inverlawell 
 1669–74: David Ross of Balnagown 
 1669–74: Sir George Mackenzie of Rosehaugh 
 1678 (convention), 1681–82: Sir Roderick Mackenzie of Findone 
 1685–86: Sir Donald Bayne of Tulloch 
 1689–97: Sir John Munro of Foulis (died 1697) 
 1693–1702: Sir Alexander Mackenzie of Coul
 1697–1701: Sir Robert Munro of Foulis
 1702–07: Sir Kenneth Mackenzie of Scatwell
 1702–04: Sir Kenneth Mackenzie of Gairloch (died 1704)
 1704–07: George Mackenzie of Cromarty and Grandvale

References

See also
 List of constituencies in the Parliament of Scotland at the time of the Union

Constituencies of the Parliament of Scotland (to 1707)
Constituencies disestablished in 1707
1707 disestablishments in Scotland
Ross and Cromarty